The alpha-2 (α2) adrenergic receptor (or adrenoceptor) is a G protein-coupled receptor (GPCR) associated with the Gi heterotrimeric G-protein. It consists of three highly homologous subtypes, including α2A-, α2B-, and α2C-adrenergic. Some species other than humans express a fourth α2D-adrenergic receptor as well. Catecholamines like norepinephrine (noradrenaline) and epinephrine (adrenaline) signal through the α2-adrenergic receptor in the central and peripheral nervous systems.

Cellular localization 
The α2A adrenergic receptor is localised in the following central nervous system (CNS) structures:

 Brainstem (especially the locus coeruleus)
 Midbrain
 Hypothalamus
 Hippocampus
 Spinal cord
 Cerebral cortex
 Cerebellum
 Septum
Whereas the α2B adrenergic receptor is localised in the following CNS structures:
 Olfactory system
 Thalamus
 Pyramidal layer of the hippocampus
 Cerebellar Purkinje layer
and the α2C adrenergic receptor is localised in the CNS structures:
 Midbrain
 Thalamus
 Amygdala
 Dorsal root ganglia
 Olfactory system
 Hippocampus
 Cerebral cortex
 Basal ganglia
 Substantia nigra
 Ventral tegmentum

Effects 
The α2-adrenergic receptor is classically located on vascular prejunctional terminals where it inhibits the release of norepinephrine (noradrenaline) in a form of negative feedback.  It is also located on the vascular smooth muscle cells of certain blood vessels, such as those found in skin arterioles or on veins, where it sits alongside the more plentiful  α1-adrenergic receptor.  The α2-adrenergic receptor binds both norepinephrine released by sympathetic postganglionic fibers and epinephrine (adrenaline) released by the adrenal medulla, binding norepinephrine with slightly higher affinity. It has several general functions in common with the α1-adrenergic receptor, but also has specific effects of its own.  Agonists (activators) of the  α2-adrenergic receptor are frequently used in anaesthesia where they affect sedation, muscle relaxation and analgesia through effects on the central nervous system (CNS).

General 
Common effects include:

 Suppression of release of norepinephrine (noradrenaline) by negative feedback.
Transient hypertension (increase in blood pressure), followed by a sustained hypotension (decrease in blood pressure).
Vasoconstriction of certain arteries
 Vasoconstriction of arteries to heart (coronary artery); however, the extent of this effect may be limited and may be negated by the vasodilatory effect from β2 receptors
 Constriction of some vascular smooth muscle
 Venoconstriction of veins
 Decrease motility of smooth muscle in gastrointestinal tract
 Inhibition of lipolysis
 Facilitation of the cognitive functions associated with the prefrontal cortex (PFC; working memory, attention, executive functioning, etc.)
 Sedation
 Analgesia

Individual 
Individual actions of the α2 receptor include:

 Mediates synaptic transmission in pre- and postsynaptic nerve terminals
 Decrease release of acetylcholine
 Decrease release of norepinephrine
 Inhibit norepinephrine system in brain
 Inhibition of lipolysis in adipose tissue
 Inhibition of insulin release in pancreas
 Induction of glucagon release from pancreas
 platelet aggregation
 Contraction of sphincters of the gastrointestinal tract
 Decreased secretion from salivary gland
 Relax gastrointestinal tract (presynaptic effect)
 Decreased aqueous humor fluid production from the ciliary body

Signaling cascade 
The α subunit of an inhibitory G protein - Gi dissociates from the G protein, and associates with adenylyl cyclase. This causes the inactivation of adenylyl cyclase, resulting in a decrease of cAMP produced from ATP, which leads to a decrease of intracellular cAMP. PKA is not able to be activated by cAMP, so proteins such as phosphorylase kinase cannot be phosphorylated by PKA. In particular, phosphorylase kinase is responsible for the phosphorylation and activation of glycogen phosphorylase, an enzyme necessary for glycogen breakdown. Thus in this pathway, the downstream effect of adenylyl cyclase inactivation is decreased breakdown of glycogen.

The relaxation of gastrointestinal tract motility is by presynaptic inhibition, where transmitters inhibit further release  by homotropic effects.

Agonists

 4-NEMD
 7-Me-marsanidine (also I1 agonist)
 Agmatine (also I agonist, NMDA, 5-HT3, nicotinic antagonist and NOS inhibitor)
 Apraclonidine
 Brimonidine
 Cannabigerol (also acts as a moderate affinity 5-HT1A receptor antagonist, and low affinity CB1 receptor antagonist).
 Clonidine (also I1 agonist)
 Detomidine
 Dexmedetomidine
 Fadolmidine
 Guanabenz
 Guanfacine
 Lofexidine
 Marsanidine 
 Medetomidine
 Methamphetamine
 Methylphenidate;
 Mivazerol
 Rilmenidine (also I agonist) 
 Romifidine
 Talipexole (also dopamine agonist)
 Tiamenidine
 Tizanidine
 Tolonidine
 Xylazine
 Xylometazoline

Partial agonists

 Oxymetazoline (also α1 agonist)
 TDIQ 
 
Antagonists

 1-PP (active metabolite of buspirone and gepirone)
 Aripiprazole
 Asenapine
 Atipamezole
 Cirazoline
 Clozapine
 Efaroxan
 Idazoxan
 Lurasidone
 Melperone
 Mianserin
 Mirtazapine
 Napitane 
 Olanzapine
 Paliperidone (also primary active metabolite of Risperidone) 
 Phenoxybenzamine
 Phentolamine
 Piribedil
 Rauwolscine
 Risperidone
 Rotigotine (α2B antagonist, non-selective)
 Quetiapine
 Norquetiapine (primary active metabolite of Quetiapine)
 Setiptiline
 Tolazoline
 Yohimbine
 Ziprasidone
 Zotepine (discontinued)

Agonists

Norepinephrine has higher affinity for the α2 receptor than has epinephrine, and therefore relates less to the latter's functions. Nonselective α2 agonists include the antihypertensive drug clonidine, which can be used to lower blood pressure and to reduce hot flashes associated with menopause. Clonidine has also been successfully used in indications that exceed what would be expected from a simple blood-pressure lowering drug: it has recently shown positive results in children with ADHD who have tics resulting from the treatment with a CNS stimulant drug, such as Adderall XR or methylphenidate; clonidine also helps alleviate symptoms of opioid withdrawal. The hypotensive effect of clonidine was initially attributed through its agonist action on presynaptic α2 receptors, which act as a down-regulator on the amount of norepinephrine released in the synaptic cleft, an example of autoreceptor. However, it is now known that clonidine binds to imidazoline receptors with a much greater affinity than α2 receptors, which would account for its applications outside the field of hypertension alone. Imidazoline receptors occur in the nucleus tractus solitarii and also the centrolateral medulla.  Clonidine is now thought to decrease blood pressure via this central mechanism. Other nonselective agonists include dexmedetomidine, lofexidine (another antihypertensive), TDIQ (partial agonist), tizanidine (in spasms, cramping) and xylazine. Xylazine has veterinary use.

In the European Union, dexmedetomidine received a marketing authorization from the European Medicines Agency (EMA) on August 10, 2012, under the brand name of Dexdor. It is indicated for sedation in the ICU for patients needing mechanical ventilation.

In non-human species this is an immobilizing and anesthetic drug, presumptively also mediated by α2 adrenergic receptors because it is reversed by yohimbine, an α2 antagonist.

α2A selective agonists include guanfacine (an antihypertensive) and Brimonidine (UK 14,304).

(R)-3-nitrobiphenyline is an α2C selective agonist as well as being a weak antagonist at the α and α subtypes.

Antagonists

Nonselective α blockers include, A-80426, atipamezole, phenoxybenzamine, efaroxan, idazoxan*(experimental), and SB-269,970.

Yohimbine* is a relatively selective alpha-2 blocker that has been investigated as a treatment for erectile dysfunction.

Tetracyclic antidepressants mirtazapine and mianserin are also potent α antagonists with mirtazapine being more selective for α2 subtype (~30-fold selective over α1) than mianserin (~17-fold).

α2A selective blockers include BRL-44408 and RX-821,002.

α2B selective blockers include ARC-239 and imiloxan.

α2C selective blockers include JP-1302 and spiroxatrine, the latter also being a serotonin 5-HT1A antagonist.

See also 
 Adrenergic receptor

References

External links 
 

Adrenergic receptors
Human proteins